Palmomyces is a genus of fungi in the family Clypeosphaeriaceae.

The genus name of Palmomyces is according to the authors, 'in reference to the palm loving habit of this genus'.

References

External links
Index Fungorum

Xylariales